Manokaris a male given name in India. Sekar may refer to:

Sekar Ayu Asmara, Indonesian songwriter and director
Sekar Ayyanthole (born 1954), Indian painter
Sekhar Basu (born 1952), Indian scientist
Sekhar Das (born 1954), Indian film director
Sekhar Kammula (born 1972), Indian film director
Sekhar Menon (born 1984), Indian actor
Sekhar Tam Tam (born 1951), Grenadian doctor

Other uses
Sekar language of Indonesia
Sekhar v. United States, 2013 US Supreme Court case
Sekarabad, Iran

See also
Shekhar (disambiguation)

Indian masculine given names